This article is about the particular significance of the year 1708 to Wales and its people.

Incumbents
Lord Lieutenant of North Wales (Lord Lieutenant of Anglesey, Caernarvonshire, Denbighshire, Flintshire, Merionethshire, Montgomeryshire) – Hugh Cholmondeley, 1st Earl of Cholmondeley
Lord Lieutenant of South Wales (Lord Lieutenant of Glamorgan, Brecknockshire, Cardiganshire, Carmarthenshire, Monmouthshire, Pembrokeshire, Radnorshire) – Thomas Herbert, 8th Earl of Pembroke

Bishop of Bangor – John Evans
Bishop of Llandaff – John Tyler
Bishop of St Asaph – William Beveridge (until 5 March); William Fleetwood (from 6 June)
Bishop of St Davids – George Bull

Events
July - Following the British general election, some changes in representation occur in Wales:
Whig Sir Arthur Owen, 3rd Baronet, replaces Tory John Meyrick as MP for Pembroke
Whig Thomas Windsor replaces Sir Hopton Williams, 3rd Baronet, of the same party, as MP for Monmouthshire
Sir John Aubrey, 3rd Baronet, is re-elected as MP for Cardiff, after his opponent, Sir Edward Stradling, 5th Baronet, falls out with his supporters.
John Roberts replaces Sir William Williams, 2nd Baronet, as MP for Denbigh Boroughs
October – Edmund Meyrick sets up a school at Carmarthen.
Edward Lhuyd is elected a fellow of the Royal Society.
Charles Talbot, 1st Baron Talbot of Hensol, marries Cecil Mathew of Castell y Mynach in Pentyrch.

Arts and literature

New books
 (almanac)
Jenkin Evans - Catecism Byr i Blant (translation of Mathew Henry's Short Catechism for Children)

Births
8 December - Charles Hanbury Williams, diplomat and satirist (died 1759)
date unknown - John Pettingall, antiquary (died 1781)
probable 
Joshua Andrews, Baptist minister (died 1793)
Lewis Hopkin, poet and artisan (died 1771)

Deaths
5 March – William Beveridge, Bishop of St Asaph, 71
23 March - Thomas Bulkeley, politician, 75
1 December - William Wogan, judge and politician, about 70

See also
1708 in Scotland

References

1700s in Wales